This is a list of reservoirs on Jersey. Jersey Water operate six main reservoirs, with an additional two reservoirs for untreated water that can be pumped between the other reservoirs. Raw water can be stored at Mont Gavey and Augres Treatment Works, with treated water being able to be stored at Augres, Handois, Les Platons, and Westmount.

Security of water supply on the island has led to investigations into increasing the amount of water available; when at peak capacity, the combined amount of water in the six reservoirs would supply enough water for Jersey for 120 days. One option mooted is to expand Val de la Mare Reservoir, or use parts of the worked out Gigoulande Quarry as a seventh reservoir. A further option of a seventh reservoir is in the Mourier Valley on the north-western side of the island. The six main reservoirs listed fall under Reservoir (Jersey) Law 1996.

Reservoirs

Some abstraction points are located on smaller reservoirs such as La Hague, and Le Maseline.

References

Sources

External links

130 years of Jersey Water ISSUU weblink

Lists of dams and reservoirs by country
Lists of bodies of water
reservoirs